The Detroit Michigan Temple is the 63rd operating temple of the Church of Jesus Christ of Latter-day Saints (LDS Church). It is located in Bloomfield Hills, a suburb of Detroit.

History
The Detroit Michigan temple was announced in August 1998. It was one of several dozen temples planned for construction by church president Gordon B. Hinckley during the late 1990s. The estimated $5 million structure would be the church's first temple built in Michigan.
Ground was broken, to signify the beginning of construction, on October 10, 1998. The construction of the temple occurred over the following year, highlighted by an Angel Moroni statue being added to the steeple in July 1999. During a public open house, about 28,000 people toured the temple, seeing the beautiful architecture and furnishings as well as learning about the purpose of LDS temples.

Hinckley dedicated the temple on October 23, 1999. The temple features a classic modern single spire design constructed with Imperial Danby White marble quarried in Vermont.

The temple serves church members in the Lower Peninsula of Michigan, northwest Ohio and the church's London Ontario Stake, which includes the border towns of Sarnia and Windsor in Ontario.  Sault Ste. Marie, Michigan and the eastern third of the Upper Peninsula is also in the temple district.  As of 2022, Southwest Michigan around Benton Harbor, Kalamazoo, Battle Creek, and Niles are currently assigned to the Chicago Illinois Temple.

The Detroit Michigan Temple is located on the same property as the primary meetinghouse of Bloomfield Hills Michigan Stake, called the stake center.  The stake center was built in the 1950s under the direction of then-stake president George W. Romney.  It was dedicated in 1957 by David O. McKay, the church president at the time.

In the fall of 2012, construction was done to enclose the entrance way to give more assembly space for groups gathering to enter the temple.

In 2020, like all the church's other temples, the Detroit Michigan Temple was closed for a time in response to the coronavirus pandemic.

See also

 Comparison of temples of The Church of Jesus Christ of Latter-day Saints
 List of temples of The Church of Jesus Christ of Latter-day Saints
 List of temples of The Church of Jesus Christ of Latter-day Saints by geographic region
 Temple architecture (Latter-day Saints)
 The Church of Jesus Christ of Latter-day Saints in Michigan

Additional reading

References

External links
Detroit Michigan Temple Official site
Detroit Michigan Temple at ChurchofJesusChristTemples.org

20th-century Latter Day Saint temples
Bloomfield Hills, Michigan
Buildings and structures in Oakland County, Michigan
Latter Day Saint movement in Michigan
Religious buildings and structures in Michigan
Temples (LDS Church) completed in 1999
Temples (LDS Church) in the United States
1999 establishments in Michigan